Ravensdale is a suburb of the Central Coast region of New South Wales, Australia. It is part of the  local government area. In the 2016 Census, there were 64 people in Ravensdale.

References

Suburbs of the Central Coast (New South Wales)